The Trucks is the debut studio album by the electronic rock band The Trucks. It was released in 2006 on Clickpop Records. The Trucks played Sasquatch! Music Festival in 2006.

Track listing 
 "Introduction" – 3:22
 "Titties" – 4:22
 "Zombie" – 3:21
 "Shattered" – 3:12
 "Messages" – 3:25
 "Old Bikes" – 2:55
 "Man Voice" – 3:09
 "Comeback" – 3:58
 "3AM" – 4:03
 "Big Afros" – 2:17
 "March 1st" – 2:55
 "Diddle-Bot" – 3:45
 "Why The?" – 3:50

External links
The Trucks Interview at SXSW
The Trucks review at Three Imaginary Girls
The Trucks Review on NPR

2006 debut albums
The Trucks albums